Gravitational biology is the study of the effects gravity has on living organisms. Throughout the history of the Earth life has evolved to survive changing conditions, such as changes in the climate and habitat. However, one constant factor in evolution since life first began on Earth is the force of gravity. As a consequence, all biological processes are accustomed to the ever-present force of gravity and even small variations in this force can have significant impact on the health and function and the system of organisms.

Gravity and life on Earth 
The force of gravity on the surface of the Earth, normally denoted g, has remained constant in both direction and magnitude since the formation of the planet. As a result, both plant and animal life have evolved to rely upon and cope with it in various ways.

Plant use of gravity 

Plant tropisms are directional movements of a plant with respect to a directional stimulus. One such tropism is gravitropism, or the growth or movement of a plant with respect to gravity. Plant roots grow towards the pull of gravity and away from sunlight, and shoots and stems grow against the pull of gravity and towards sunlight.

Animal struggles with gravity 
Gravity has had an effect on the development of animal life since the first single-celled organism.
The size of single biological cells is inversely proportional to the strength of the gravitational field exerted on the cell. That is, in stronger gravitational fields the size of cells decreases, and in weaker gravitational fields the size of cells increases. Gravity is thus a limiting factor in the growth of individual cells.

Cells which were naturally larger than the size that gravity alone would allow for had to develop means to protect against internal sedimentation. Several of these methods are based upon protoplasmic motion, thin and elongated shape of the cell body, increased cytoplasmic viscosity, and a reduced range of specific gravity of cell components relative to the ground-plasma.

The effects of gravity on many-celled organisms is considerably more drastic. During the period when animals first evolved to survive on land some method of directed locomotion and thus a form of inner skeleton or outer skeleton would have been required to cope with the increase in the force of gravity due to the weakened upward force of buoyancy. Prior to this point, most lifeforms were small and had a worm- or jellyfish-like appearance, and without this evolutionary step would not have been able to maintain their form or move on land.

In larger terrestrial vertebrates gravitational forces influence musculoskeletal systems, fluid distribution, and hydrodynamics of the circulation.

Gravity and life elsewhere 

Every day the realization of space habitation becomes closer, and even today space stations exist and are home to long-term, though not yet permanent, residents. Because of this, there is a growing scientific interest in how changes in the gravitational field influence different aspects of the physiology of living organisms, especially mammals, since these results can normally be closely related to the expected effects on humans. All current research in this field can be classified into two groups.

The first group consists of the experiments that involve gravitational fields of less than one g, termed hypogravity, without artificial gravity, or microgravity. A space station or a spacecraft in a spaceflight will be in hypogravity. Therefore, understanding of the effects of hypogravity on the human body is necessary for prolonged space travel and colonization.

The second group consist of those involving gravitational fields of more than one g, termed hypergravity. For brief periods during take-off and landing of space craft, astronauts are under the influence of hypergravity. Understanding the effects of hypergravity are also necessary if colonization of planets larger than the Earth is ever to take place.

Recent experiments
Recent experiments have proven that alterations in metabolism, immune cell function, cell division, and cell attachment all occur in the hypogravity of space. For example, after a matter of days in microgravity (< 10−3 g), human immune cells were unable to differentiate into mature cells. One of the large implications of this is that if certain cells cannot differentiate in space, organisms may not be able to reproduce successfully after exposure to zero gravity.

Scientists believe that the stress associated with space flight is responsible for the inability of some cells to differentiate. These stresses can alter metabolic activities and can disturb the chemical processes in living organisms. A specific example would be that of bone cell growth. Microgravity impedes the development of bone cells. Bone cells must attach themselves to something shortly after development and will die if they cannot. Without the downward pull of a gravitational force on these bone cells, they float around randomly and eventually die off. This suggests that the direction of gravity may give the cells clues as to where to attach themselves.

See also
 Astrobiology
 Cell biology
 Gravitation
 Space colonization
 Space exploration

References 

Gravity
Astrobiology